Ortholepis rectilineella is a species of snout moth in the genus Ortholepis. It was described by Ragonot in 1888. It is found in South Africa.

References

Endemic moths of South Africa
Phycitini
Moths described in 1888